Brampton Soccer Centre is a soccer facility, opened on June 25, 2007.

History and details

Prompted by ward 9 & 10 Councillor (2003-06) Garnett Manning, Mayor Susan Fennell and Brampton city councillors promoted the idea of a new recreation centre on the southwest corner of Dixie Road and Sandalwood Parkway location.  The initial concept for the facility was to have it host Ice Hockey, Basketball/Volleyball and Soccer.  Community feedback however, resulted in a shift in the plans, thus rendering the building as a soccer only facility. (Evidence of the original plans is quite obvious in attendance as each of the 4 turf fields has 'Zamboni' access.) The facility was created by Atlas Corporation at the cost of $26.9 million. On the grand opening day, approximately 2000 people celebrated with a huge community barbecue, and took part in a giant group photo to commemorate the opening of the centre.

Brampton Soccer Centre is a citywide destination location, which serves all Brampton residents. Outside the centre, there are four outdoor soccer field with two overlapping cricket pitches. Inside, there are four indoor soccer fields and community rooms. The facility was designed and developed by the City of Brampton and is accessible to facility users of all ages. The centre is used by the four major Brampton soccer clubs: Brampton Adult Soccer, Brampton Youth Soccer Club, Brampton East Youth Soccer Club, and Brams United Girls Soccer Club. The centre also hosts pick up soccer.

Statistics
64,000 soccer players play during the 8 month indoor season.
8,700 soccer and cricket players play during the 5 month outdoor season.
Approximate cost of the facility: $26,882,680.
Gross site area: 121,000 sq. metres (excluding the outdoor fields)
Size of building: 14,193 sq. metres
Total occupancy: 2,590
Total diameter: 3,000 ft.

Indoor program components
Let's Play Café - food and refreshments
Youth Drop Off Center - while older siblings or parents participate in activities
Preschool programs
Parent and child programs
Day programs
Specialty crafts
Yoga
Dance programs
Senior's Programs
Young Teen Programs

References

External links

Official site
Photo gallery of the facility being created

Buildings and structures in Brampton
Sports venues in Ontario
Tourist attractions in Brampton
2007 establishments in Ontario
Sports venues completed in 2007
Soccer venues in Canada